Charles Robert Coe (October 26, 1923 – May 16, 2001) was an American amateur golfer who is considered by many to be one of the greatest American amateurs in history. A two-time U.S. Amateur winner, Coe never turned professional either because, as he stated in 1998, "When I was growing up, golf was a gentleman's game," or because his wife said, "if I thought I was going to raise three children out of a suitcase, I was crazy". He had a successful career in the oil business.

Born in Ardmore, Oklahoma, Coe served as a pilot during World War II, and later attended the University of Oklahoma from 1946 to 1948. He won the Big Seven Conference championship all three years. He was a member of the Gamma Phi chapter of Beta Theta Pi.

Coe won the U.S. Amateur in 1949, beating Rufus King 11 & 10 in the finals, and won it again in 1958 with a 5 & 4 victory over Tommy Aaron. He finished runner-up to Jack Nicklaus in the 1959 tournament. Coe won the Western Amateur in 1950, and made the finals of the British Amateur in 1951, losing to Dick Chapman. He won four Trans-Mississippi Amateurs, in  1947, 1949, 1952, and 1956. He played on six Walker Cup teams from 1949 to 1963, including as playing captain on the 1959 team, and was non-playing captain on a seventh team in 1957.

Coe made 19 Masters Tournament appearances and owns almost every Masters amateur record, including most cuts made (15); top-25 finishes (9); top-10 finishes (3); eagles (6), rounds played (67) and most times low amateur (6). Coe won low amateur honors at Augusta in four consecutive decades: 1940s, 1950s, 1960s and 1970s. He also holds the amateur records for best finish (2nd in 1961), lowest third round score (67 in 1959), and lowest 72-hole score (281 in 1961). In 1961, Coe rallied in the final round from six shots down to finish one stroke behind Gary Player.

In 1964, Coe received the Bob Jones Award, given by the United States Golf Association in recognition of distinguished sportsmanship in golf. Coe was posthumously named an honoree at the 2006 Memorial Tournament. When he died, the Rocky Mountain News quoted a Castle Pines golf club member saying, "Charlie Coe was an amateur at everything except life."

The Charlie Coe Golf Center at the University of Oklahoma is named in his honor. He was inducted into the Oklahoma Sports Hall of Fame in 1987. Coe died in his sleep on May 16, 2001 in Oklahoma City, Oklahoma.

Amateur wins (7)
this list is probably incomplete
1947 Trans-Mississippi Amateur
1949 U.S. Amateur, Trans-Mississippi Amateur
1950 Western Amateur
1952 Trans-Mississippi Amateur
1956 Trans-Mississippi Amateur
1958 U.S. Amateur
1963 Mt. Vernon Classic

Major championships

Amateur wins (2)

Results timeline

Note: Coe never played in The Open Championship nor the PGA Championship.

LA = Low amateur
DQ = disqualified
CUT = missed the half-way cut
R256, R128, R64, R32, R16, QF, SF = Round in which player lost in match play
"T" indicates a tie for a place

Source for The Masters: www.masters.com

Source for U.S. Open and U.S. Amateur: USGA Championship Database

Source for 1959 British Amateur: The Glasgow Herald, May 28, 1959, pg. 9.

U.S. national team appearances
Amateur
Walker Cup: 1949 (winners), 1951 (winners), 1953 (winners), 1957 (winners, non-playing captain) 1959 (winners, playing captain), 1961 (winners), 1963 (winners)
Eisenhower Trophy: 1958
Americas Cup: 1952 (winners), 1954 (winners), 1958 (winners), 1960 (winners), 1961 (winners), 1963 (winners)

References

External links
Oklahoma Sports Hall of Fame profile
Article on Coe at the Masters
Charlie Coe Golf Learning Center at the University of Oklahoma
Encyclopedia of Oklahoma History and Culture - Coe, Charles Robert (1923-2001)
1951 British Amateur film clip

American male golfers
Amateur golfers
Oklahoma Sooners men's golfers
Golfers from Oklahoma
American World War II pilots
American military personnel of World War II
People from Ardmore, Oklahoma
1923 births
2001 deaths